Djanet Lachmet (born 1948) is an Algerian novelist and actress.

Life
Djanet Lachmet was born in a small town in Algeria. Forced into marriage at sixteen, she divorced three months later. Wanting to be a comedian, she studied drama for four years at Bordj El Kiffan. From 1968 to 1972 she lived in Canada, and later moved to Paris to work as an actress.

Works
 Le Cow-Boy. Paris: Belfond, 1983. Translated into English by Judith Still as Lallia, 1987.
 'Une Composante de l'underground français', Actualités de l'émigration 80, 11 March 1986

References

Further reading
 Ammar-Khodja, Soumya. 'Djanet Lachmet. Le cow boy & Hafsa Zinaï-Koudil. La fin d'un rêve'. In Christiane Achour (ed.) Diwan d'inquiétude et d'espoir. La littérature féminine algérienne de langue française, ENAG/Éditions, 1991, pp. 390–411
 Still, Judith 'Body and Culture: The representation of sexual, racial and class differences in Lachmet's Le Cow-boy.' In Margaret Atack & Phil Powrie (eds.) Contemporary French Fiction by Women: Feminist Perspectives, Manchester: Manchester University Press, 1990,pp. 71–83
 Still, Judith. 'Djanet Lachmet's Le Cow-Boy: Constructing self - Arab and female', Paragraph 8 (October 1986), pp. 55–61

1948 births
Living people
Algerian novelists
Algerian women novelists
Algerian actresses
Algerian expatriates in Canada
Algerian expatriates in France
20th-century Algerian writers
20th-century Algerian women writers
21st-century Algerian writers
21st-century Algerian women writers